Waco Airport may refer to:

 TSTC Waco Airport (CNW) near Waco, Texas, USA
 Waco Kungo Airport (CEO) near Uaco Cungo, Angola
 Waco Regional Airport (ACT) near Waco, Texas, USA